Ramón Quiroga Arancibia (born 23 July 1950) is a former football player and coach who played as a goalkeeper. Born in Argentina, he obtained 40 caps playing for the Peru national football team.

He is currently a youth coach for the Peruvian club Cienciano.

Club career
He began his career playing for the Argentine club Rosario Central.

International career
Quiroga is perhaps best remembered for his appearance at the 1978 FIFA World Cup in a match against Poland, when he ran all the way to the opposition half and fouled Grzegorz Lato, receiving a yellow card in the process. In that tournament, he also conceded 6 goals in the match against Argentina, the country of his birth.

References

External links
 The knowledge at The Guardian football website
 RPP Noticias 
 

1950 births
Living people
Footballers from Rosario, Santa Fe
Argentine people of Galician descent
Peruvian people of Galician descent
Peruvian people of Argentine descent
Sportspeople of Argentine descent
Argentine emigrants to Peru
Naturalized citizens of Peru
Association football goalkeepers
Argentine footballers
Peruvian footballers
Peru international footballers
1978 FIFA World Cup players
1982 FIFA World Cup players
Peruvian Primera División players
Argentine Primera División players
Rosario Central footballers
Sporting Cristal footballers
Club Atlético Independiente footballers
Barcelona S.C. footballers
Colegio Nacional Iquitos footballers
Club Universitario de Deportes footballers
Peruvian expatriate footballers
Expatriate footballers in Argentina
Expatriate footballers in Ecuador
Peruvian expatriate sportspeople in Ecuador
Argentine football managers
Peruvian football managers
Club Universitario de Deportes managers
Cienciano managers
Deportivo Municipal managers
León de Huánuco managers